Timur Malik was a statesman of the Khwarazmian Empire, who served as the governor of Khujand in the region of Transoxiana. He is known for his valiant though ultimately unsuccessful defense of Khujand in 1219-1220 during the Mongol invasions, and is hence considered a national hero in Tajikistan. He has been described in a historical novel authored by a famous Urdu novelist Nasim Hejazi, the novel is named as ''Akhri Chattan (آخری چٹان)'.

Biography 
Timur Malik was sometime before the Mongol invasions appointed as the governor of Khujand, a city famous for its vineyards and gardens, for its trade, and for the bold citizens. The city also had a citadel, and when the Mongols arrived, the citizens withdrew behind its walls.

He died in 1220 defending the city against the Mongols.

References

Sources 
 
 
 
 
1220 deaths
History of Tajikistan